Doris A. Davis (born circa 1935) is a former mayor of Compton, California, who earned a place in history as the first African-American woman mayor of a metropolitan city in the United States.

Political career
In 1965, 33-year-old Davis defeated incumbent Clyde Harland to become Compton's first black City Clerk.  Eight years later she challenged and defeated another incumbent, Compton Mayor Douglas Dollarhide.  By doing so, she became the first female African American Mayor of a major metropolitan city.   However, after four years as mayor she did not seek re-election.

Davis was succeeded in 1977 by another African-American, Lionel Cade, an accountant and former member of the city council, who also served only one term.

In 1986, Davis unsuccessfully ran for a seat in the California State Assembly, 54th District. She finished third in the Democratic primary.

Until 2013, Davis was the only female mayor in Compton's history. On June 4, 2013, Aja Brown was elected as Compton's 2nd female mayor and the city's youngest mayor. In 2004, Alita Godwin became only the second black woman to serve as Compton City Clerk.

References 
Jet, June 11, 2001, vol. 99 issue 26, p. 19
Los Angeles Herald-Examiner, "Distaff mayor determined in dream for Compton", November 11, 1973, pt. A, p. 10
Los Angeles Herald-Examiner, "Compton's mayor Doris Davis speaks out", April 19, 1974, p. A-2
Los Angeles Times, "Doris Davis running hard and fast", September 23, 1973, pt. 10, p1

1935 births
Living people
Mayors of Compton, California
African-American mayors in California
Women mayors of places in California
Place of birth missing (living people)
21st-century African-American people
21st-century African-American women
20th-century African-American people
20th-century African-American women
African-American women mayors